Arene venustula is a species of small sea snail, a marine gastropod mollusk in the family Areneidae.

Description

The shell can grow to be 8.2 mm in length.

Distribution
Arene venustula can be found from East Florida to Cuba.

References

Areneidae
Gastropods described in 1936